Atmospheric-pressure plasma (or AP plasma or normal pressure plasma) is a plasma in which the pressure approximately matches that of the surrounding atmosphere – the so-called normal pressure.

Technical significance  
Atmospheric-pressure plasmas have prominent technical significance because in contrast with low-pressure plasma or high-pressure plasma no reaction vessel is needed to ensure the maintenance of a pressure level differing from atmospheric pressure. Accordingly, depending on the principle of generation, these plasmas can be employed directly in the production line. The need for cost-intensive chambers for producing a partial vacuum as used in low-pressure plasma technology is eliminated.

Plasma generation 
Various forms of excitation are distinguished:
 AC (alternating current) excitation
 DC (direct current) and low-frequency excitation
 Excitation by means of radio waves
 Microwave excitation

Atmospheric-pressure plasmas that have attained any noteworthy industrial significance are those generated by DC excitation (electric arc), AC excitation (corona discharge, dielectric barrier discharge, piezoelectric direct discharge and plasma jets as well as 2.45 GHz microwave microplasma).

Operating principle of a DC plasma jet 
By means of a high-voltage discharge (5–15 kV, 10–100 kHz) a pulsed electric arc is generated. A process gas, usually oil-free compressed air flowing past this discharge section, is excited and converted to the plasma state. This plasma passes through a jet head to the surface of the material to be treated. The jet head determines the geometry of the beam, and is at earth potential to hold back potential-carrying parts of the plasma stream.

Operating principle of a microwave plasma jet 
A microwave system uses amplifiers that output up to 200 watts of power radio frequency (RF) power to produce the arc that generates plasma. Most solutions work at 2.45 GHz. A new technology provides ignition and highly efficient operation with the same electronic and couple network. This kind of atmospheric-pressure plasmas is different. The plasma is only top of the electrode. That is the reason the construction of a cannula jet was possible.

Applications 
Manufacturers use plasma jets for, among other things, activating and cleaning plastic and metal surfaces to prepare them for adhesive bonding and painting. Sheet materials up to several meters wide can be treated today by aligning a number of jets in a row. Surface modification achieved by plasma jets is comparable to the effects obtained with low-pressure plasma.

Depending on the power of the jet, the plasma beam can be up to 40 mm long and attain a treatment width of 15 mm. Special rotary systems allow a treatment width per jet tool of up to 13 cm.
Depending on the required treatment performance, the plasma source is moved at a spacing of 10–40 mm and at a speed of 5–400 m/min relative to the surface of the material being treated.

A key advantage of this system is it can be integrated in-line in existing production systems. In addition the activation achievable is distinctly higher than in potential-based pretreatment methods (corona discharge).

It is possible to coat varied surfaces with this technique. Anticorrosive layers and adhesion promoter layers can be applied to many metals without solvents, providing a much more environmentally friendly solution.

See also
Laser Schlieren Deflectometry
List of plasma (physics) articles
Dielectric barrier discharge
Plasma pencil

References 

Citations

Bibliography
 Tendero C., Tixier C., Tristant P., Desmaison J., Leprince P.: Atmospheric pressure plasmas: A review; Spectrochimica Acta Part B: Atomic Spectroscopy; Volume 61, Issue 1, January 2006, pp 2–30.
 Förnsel P.: Vorrichtung zur Oberflächen-Vorbehandlung von Werkstücken (Device for surface pretreatment of workpieces); DE 195 32 412
 EU-IP4Plasma e-learning portal: Basic facts on the fourth state of matter and its technical use  
 Fraunhofer-Institut für Fertigungstechnik und Angewandte Materialforschung (IFAM): Plasmatechnik und Oberflächen (Plasma technology and surfaces) – PLATO
 Leibniz Institute for Plasma Science and Technology (INP Greifswald e.V.)
 Generation of atmospheric plasma and effect on surfaces - Flash animations
 Pulsed Atmospheric Arc Technology
 Atmospheric Plasma Treatment Explained in Simple Terms from the UK manufacturer Henniker Plasma
 Plasmatreat US LP: Atmospheric Plasma Treatment
  Basics of microwave driven atmospheric plasma

Plasma physics